Xorychti a village and a community in the municipal unit of Mouresi in the eastern part of Magnesia, Greece. It is situated at 420 m elevation, on the eastern slope of the forested Pelion mountains. Its population in 2011 was 219 for the village and 248 for the community which includes the village Kato Xorychti. Xorychti is located 2 km northwest of Lampinou, 3 km south of Tsagkarada, 5 km northeast of Milies, 12 km southeast of Zagora and 21 km east of the city of Volos (Magnesia's capital).

Population

See also

List of settlements in the Magnesia regional unit

References

External links
Xorychti on GTP Travel Pages (in English and Greek)

Populated places in Pelion